XHETS-FM is a radio station on 94.7 FM in Tapachula, Chiapas. It carries the Ke Buena grupera format from Televisa Radio.

History
The former XETS-AM is among the oldest radio stations in Chiapas. It received its concession in 1942 and originally operated on 630 kHz, later moving to 780 in the 1990s or early 2000s. It was approved for AM-FM migration in 2010.

References

Radio stations in Chiapas